The British College (also known as TBC) is an independent institution located in Trade Tower Business Center, Thapathali, Kathmandu. It offers British and international qualifications. 

The British College offers undergraduate and postgraduate programmes which are awarded by its two partner UK universities: the University of the West of England (UWE) and Leeds Beckett University (LBU).

History
The British College was established in 2012 with the objective of providing undergraduate and postgraduate courses, awarded by reputable UK universities. As a subsidiary of the Kandel Foundation, TBC was founded by the CEO Rajen Kandel, along with his brother, Mahendra Kandel and father Upendra Sharma.  The College works in partnership with the University of the West of England (popularly known as UWE) and Leeds Beckett University(formerly Leeds Metropolitan University). The undergraduate and postgraduate courses that TBC offers are focused on Business Studies and Computing. The College also provides other courses such as GCE A Level and ACCA.

Courses

Intermediate

GCE A Levels

The British College’s sister organisation, The British Model College (BMC), offers prestigious Cambridge Assessment International Education A Level programme. Established in 2013, the College is registered with Cambridge Assessment International Education (Centre Number NP 744)  and has received approval from the Ministry of Education, Government of Nepal.  The College offers a limited number of scholarships to highly meritorious but financially restricted students.

Under-graduate programmes

BBA (Hons) Business and Management

The BBA (Hons) Business and Management degree is a 4-year course affiliated with UWE, in which students study one foundation year, before beginning their three-year undergraduate study. It is multidisciplinary in nature and can lead to many possible career options, whether in the private or public sector. The modules are designed to provide a strong foundation in business, whilst developing the ability to work effectively as a group in a disciplined and structured environment. Moreover, it helps to develop essential skills such as problem-solving, decision making, and communication.

BSc (Hons) Hospitality Business Management (BHM)

The BSc (Hons) Hospitality Business Management (BHM) degree is a 4-year course affiliated with LBU, in which students study one foundation year, before beginning their three-year undergraduate study. It is designed to engage, enable, and challenge students to become creative, entrepreneurial, and critically informed dynamic graduates who can excel in their chosen field of work - or progress to further study within hospitality business management. The learning and teaching activities throughout the course enable students to succeed at every level.

BSc (Hons) Computing

The B.Sc (Hons) Computing programme is run in partnership with Leeds Beckett University, UK. The course focuses on computer programming, database development, networking, website development, systems modelling, and computer security. This course is equivalent to BSc CSIT and BIT in Nepal.

Post-graduate programmes

MBA (Graduate)

The MBA programme offered by The British College in Kathmandu is a career-oriented programme delivered in partnership with Leeds Beckett University, UK. The primary aim of the programme is to provide postgraduate level knowledge, understanding, and skills that prepare students for their career in business and management.

MBA (Executive)

The MBA (Executive) programme offers the unique opportunity to gain an internationally recognised Master's degree in Nepal from a distinguished British University. Offered by The British College (TBC), it is a career development programme that is provided by Leeds Beckett University, UK. The programme is aimed at experienced business professionals with more than two years of industry experience.

MSc International Business Management

The MSc International Business Management is provided in partnership with the University of the West of England, UK. It is designed for those who have recently completed their undergraduate degree and wish to progress to a career in management within a corporation, government, or international organisation.

MSc Information and Technology

The MSc Information and Technology is run in partnership with Leeds Beckett University, UK. It integrates the technological and business aspects of modern IT, in order to address the high demands of both the private and public sector.

ACCA programme
The British Professional College, owned by The British College, Kathmandu offers the ACCA programme – the largest and fastest-growing international accountancy body in the world, with over 527,000 students and 219,000 fully qualified members spread across 179 countries worldwide.

Short courses

IELTS 
The British College offers an intensive IELTS course for students aiming to achieve high scores in a short period of time.

Pearson Test of English (PTE) Academic 
The British College is also an exam centre for the Pearson Test for English (PTE) Academic. The Pearson Test of English (PTE) Academic is entirely computer-based. It uses task-oriented questions to assess the English language ability of people who intend to study or work overseas. It differs from other tests of English proficiency in the fact that its questions, in many cases, are a combination of different skills. The test has been constructed this way to better evaluate a person’s use of English in common realistic situations and functions.

ECA/CCA 
The British College also provides extracurricular activities which are integral to the College’s programme and the student’s experience. Co-Curricular Activities (CCAs) and External Curricular Activities (ECAs) are an important part of student life. These activities provide opportunities for students to participate in team-based sports, discover new passions, develop social skills, play together.

References

External links

 

 Universities and colleges in Nepal
 Educational institutions established in 2012
2012 establishments in Nepal